This is a list of rural localities in Arkhangelsk Oblast, organized by district. It also includes rural localities in Nenets Autonomous Okrug, which is fully within Arkhangelsk Oblast. Nenets Autonomous Okrug only contains one district, Zapolyarny District.

Arkhangelsk Oblast (Arkhangelskaya oblast) is a federal subject of Russia (an oblast). It includes the Arctic archipelagos of Franz Josef Land and Novaya Zemlya, as well as the Solovetsky Islands in the White Sea. Arkhangelsk Oblast also has administrative jurisdiction over Nenets Autonomous Okrug. Including Nenetsia, Arkhangelsk Oblast has an area of 587,400 km2. Its population (including Nenetsia) was 1,227,626 as of the  2010 Census.

Arkhangelsk City  
Rural localities in Arkhangelsk city of republic significance:

 Talazhsky aviagorodok

Kargopolsky District 
Rural localities in Kargopolsky District:

 Abakumovo
 Agafonovskaya
 Andronovskaya
 Belaya
 Bolshaya Kondratovskaya
 Bolshoy Khaluy
 Gar
 Gavrilovskaya
 Kalitinka
 Kazakovo
 Kiprovo
 Krominskaya
 Lapinskaya
 Lazarevskaya
 Lodygino
 Lukino
 Malaya Kondratovskaya
 Martakovo
 Morshchikhinskaya
 Myza
 Nifantovskaya
 Nikiforovo
 Niz
 Patrovskaya
 Pesok
 Petrovskaya
 Podzyshevskaya
 Pogost Navolochny
 Pogost
 Prigorodny
 Savino
 Shelokhovskaya
 Shiryaikha
 Skoryukovo
 Solza
 Stegnevskaya
 Svarozero
 Timoshinskaya
 Turovo
 Vatamanovskaya
 Volosovskaya
 Vorobyovskaya
 Zalyazhye
 Zazhigino
 Zelyony Bor

Kholmogorsky District 
Rural localities in Kholmogorsky District:

 Belaya Gora
 Belogorsky
 Bolshaya Tovra
 Dvinskoy
 Gbach
 Ichkovo
 Kholmogory
 Konoksa
 Kopachyovo
 Lomonosovo
 Lysitsa
 Malaya Tovra
 Plakhino
 Pochtovoye
 Pogost, Khavrogorsky Selsoviet
 Pogost, Seletsky Selsoviet
 Pogost, Yemetsky Selsoviet
 Pyatkovo
 Svetly
 Ust-Pinega
 Vavchuga
 Vaymuzhsky
 Yemetsk
 Zabolotye
 Zachachye

Konoshsky District 
Rural localities in Konoshsky District:

 Fominskaya
 Fominsky
 Klimovskaya
 Melentyevsky
 Mirny
 Motylyovo
 Norinskaya
 Podyuga
 Ponomaryovskaya
 Voloshka
 Yertsevo

Kotlassky District 
Rural localities in Kotlassky District:

 Basharovo
 Borovinka
 Burmasovo
 Cheryomushsky
 Chupanovo
 Fedotovskaya
 Kharitonovo
 Kotelnikovo
 Kudrino
 Medvedki
 Novinki
 Olyushino
 Osokorskaya
 Peschanitsa
 Pustosh
 Savvatiya
 Slovenskoye
 Sogra
 Udimsky
 Varavino
 Vystavka
 Yadrikha

Krasnoborsky District 
Rural localities in Krasnoborsky District:

 Andreyevskaya
 Berezonavolok
 Bolshaya
 Bolshaya Sludka
 Cherevkovo
 Davydkovo
 Dyabrino
 Frolovskaya
 Gorodishchenskaya
 Komarovo
 Komsomolsky
 Krasnoborsk
 Kulikovo
 Monastyrskaya Pashnya
 Sakulinskaya
 Tsivozersky Pogost
 Verkhneye Shilovo
 Verkhnyaya Sergiyevskaya
 Verkhnyaya Uftyuga
 Vershina

Lensky District 
Rural localities in Lensky District:

 Belopashino
 Lena
 Pustosh
 Vyyemkovo
 Yarensk

Leshukonsky District 
Rural localities in Leshukonsky District:

 Keba
 Leshukonskoye
 Malaya Nisogora
 Pustynya

Mezensky District 
Rural localities in Mezensky District:

 Bychye
 Chizhgora
 Dolgoshchelskoye Rural Settlement
 Dorogorskoye
 Ezevets
 Intsy
 Kamenka
 Kiltsa
 Kimzha
 Lampozhnya
 Melogora
 Moseyevo
 Okulovsky
 Pogorelets
 Ruchyi
 Safonovo
 Sovpolye
 Soyana

Nyandomsky District 
Rural localities in Nyandomsky District:

 Kodino
 Loginovskaya
 Makarovskaya
 Midyuga
 Shalakusha
 Shozhma
 Sibir

Onezhsky District 
Rural localities in Onezhsky District:

 Abramovskaya
 Bolshoy Bor
 Chekuyevo
 Glazanikha
 Karamino
 Korelskoye
 Kushereka
 Kyanda
 Lyamtsa
 Malozhma
 Medvedevskaya
 Naumovskaya
 Nimenga
 Pachepelda
 Pole
 Ponga
 Porog
 Posad
 Priluky
 Purnema
 Shasta
 Syrya
 Tamitsa
 Vorzogory

Pinezhsky District 
Rural localities in Pinezhsky District:

 Aynova
 Bereznik
 Bolshoye Krotovo
 Chakola
 Gorodetsk
 Karpogory
 Kevrola
 Krasnaya Gorka
 Krivyye Ozyora
 Kulogora
 Kuloy
 Kushkopala
 Mezhdurechensky
 Novolavela
 Nyukhcha
 Pachikha
 Pinega
 Pirinem
 Ruchyi
 Shardonem
 Shasta
 Shotogorka
 Shotova
 Shuyga
 Siya
 Sosnovka
 Sura
 Valdokurye
 Vaymusha
 Verkola
 Yasny
 Yedoma
 Yorkino
 Zanyukhcha

Plesetsky District 
Rural localities in Plesetsky District:

 Alexeyevskaya
 Baratikha
 Bogdanovo
 Bolshaya Kyama
 Bulatovo
 Denislavye
 Fedovo
 Grishina
 Iksa
 Karelskoye
 Konyovo
 Koryakino
 Kositsyna
 Lipakovo
 Lomovoye
 Luzhma
 Malinovka
 Matnema
 Navolok
 Nizhneye Ustye
 Oksovsky
 Pervomaysky
 Podgornya
 Podvolochye
 Puksoozero
 Samoded
 Seza
 Shchukozerye
 Sheleksa
 Shestovo
 Sheyna
 Shishkina
 Shurenga
 Shvakino
 Skripovo
 Tarasikha
 Tarasovo
 Ulitino
 Undozero
 Vershinino
 Yakshina
 Yangory
 Yarnema
 Yemtsa
 Yura-Gora
 Yurmala
 Zakumikhinskaya
 Zashondomye

Primorsky District 
Rural localities in Primorsky District:

 Bobrovo (settlement)
 Bobrovo (village)
 Dolgoye
 Katunino
 Khorkovo
 Konetsdvorye
 Korely
 Kuya
 Lastola
 Laysky Dok
 Letnyaya Zolotitsa
 Lopshenga
 Luda
 Odinochka
 Oporno-Opytny Punkt
 Patrakeyevka
 Pertominsk
 Povrakulskaya
 Pushlakhta
 Rembuyevo
 Rikasikha
 Talagi
 Una
 Uyemsky
 Vaskovo
 Verkhnyaya Zolotitsa
 Voznesenye

Severodvinsk 
Rural localities in Severodvinsk urban okrug:

 Nyonoksa 
 Solza
 Sopka

Shenkursky District 
Rural localities in Shenkursky District:

 Chashchinskaya
 Ivanovskoye
 Kameshnik
 Kulikovskaya
 Nikiforovskaya
 Nizhnezolotilovo
 Nosovskaya
 Nosovskaya
 Odintsovskaya
 Rakovskaya
 Rovdino
 Rybogorskaya
 Shegovary
 Shipunovskaya
 Stepychevskaya

Solovetsky District 
Rural localities in Solovetsky District:

 Solovetsky

Ustyansky District 
Rural localities in Ustyansky District:

 Akichkin Pochinok
 Andreyev Pochinok
 Bereznik
 Edma
 Ileza
 Kizema
 Kononovskaya
 Loyga
 Mitinskaya
 Podgornaya
 Shangaly
 Stroyevskoye
 Studenets
 Zadorye
 Zubarevskaya

Velsky District 
Rural localities in Velsky District:

 Argunovskaya
 Argunovsky
 Artemkovskaya
 Begunovskaya
 Blagoveshchenskoye
 Borovinka
 Dolmatovo
 Dyukovskaya
 Fedkovo
 Filyayevskaya
 Georgiyevskoye
 Golovkovskaya
 Gorka Muravyovskaya
 Gridinskaya
 Ivanskoye
 Khozmino
 Kolokolovskaya
 Komsomolsky
 Kozlovskaya
 Kulakovo-Podgorye
 Luchinskaya
 Lukinskaya
 Malaya Lipovka
 Meledinskaya
 Nadruchevskaya
 Neklyudovskaya
 Nikitinskaya
 Okulovskaya
 Ovsyannikovskaya
 Palkino
 Palkinskaya
 Pasva
 Pavlovskoye
 Pershinskaya
 Petregino
 Petukhovskaya
 Pezhma
 Plesovskaya
 Pogost
 Pokrovskaya
 Prilutskaya
 Pritykinskaya
 Pugachevskaya
 Pustynga
 Rystseva Gorka
 Shilovskaya
 Shoksha
 Shunema
 Smolyanskaya
 Solginsky
 Stepankovskaya
 Terebino
 Tyogro-Ozero
 Ulasovskaya
 Ust-Shonosha
 Voronovskaya
 Voskresenskoye
 Yefremkovskaya
 Yukhnevo
 Zalemenga

Verkhnetoyemsky District 
Rural localities in Verkhnetoyemsky District:

 Abramkovo
 Akulovskaya
 Avnyugsky
 Borisovskaya
 Chyoda
 Dvinskoy
 Glinny Mys
 Isakovskaya
 Kondratovskaya
 Kornilovskaya
 Krasnaya
 Lambas
 Larionovskaya
 Lukinskaya
 Novgorodskaya
 Okulovskaya
 Rechnoy
 Shoromskaya
 Sogra
 Sosnovy
 Verkhnyaya Toyma
 Vlasyevskaya
 Voznesenskoye
 Yefimovo
 Zaytsevo
 Zelennik

Vilegodsky District 
Rural localities in Vilegodsky District:

 Ilyinsko-Podomskoye
 Kochnegovskaya
 Nikolsk
 Penkino
 Shiroky Priluk

Vinogradovsky District 
Rural localities in Vinogradovsky District:

 Alexeyevskaya
 Antonovskaya
 Artyushinskaya
 Bereznik
 Bereznichek
 Chamovo
 Fillipovskaya
 Gora
 Gorodok
 Gridinskaya
 Gusevo
 Kargovino
 Khetovo
 Khokhnovskaya
 Klykovskaya
 Konetsgorye
 Konovalovskaya
 Korbala
 Kuliga
 Kvakhtyuga
 Mikhaylovskaya
 Moleprovod
 Monastyryok
 Morshikhinskaya
 Morzhegory
 Nadozerye
 Navolok
 Nikitinskaya
 Nironovskaya
 Nizhneye Chazhestrovo
 Nizhnyaya Topsa
 Nizhnyaya Vayenga
 Novy
 Osinovo
 Panitsa
 Plyoso
 Priluk
 Pyanda
 Pyanda
 Rochegda
 Rodionovskaya
 Rostovskoye
 Ryazanovo
 Safronovskaya
 Savinskaya
 Selmenga
 Seltso
 Sergeyevskaya
 Shidrovo
 Shidrovo
 Shilenga
 Shosheltsy
 Shuzhega
 Sidorovskaya
 Skobeli
 Sloboda
 Topsa
 Troynichevskaya
 Tugarinskaya
 Ust-Morzh
 Ust-Vaga
 Ust-Vayenga
 Uyta
 Vazhsky
 Verkhneye-Chazhestrovo
 Verkhnyaya Kitsa
 Verkhnyaya Vayenga
 Vlasyevskaya
 Vorontsy
 Vysokusha
 Yakovlevskaya
 Zaborye
 Zadorikha

Zapolyarny District  
Rural localities in Zapolyarny District:

 Amderma
 Karataika
 Khorey-Ver
 Khoseda-Khardsky
 Mgla
 Nelmin-Nos
 Nes
 Pustozersk
 Shoyna
 Ust-Kara
 Varnek

See also
 
 Lists of rural localities in Russia

Notes

References

Arkhangelsk Oblast